David Mark Cooper (born 18 February 1972) is a New Zealand former cricketer. He played four first-class matches for Central Districts between 1993 and 1997.

References

External links
 

1972 births
Living people
New Zealand cricketers
Central Districts cricketers
Cricketers from Whanganui